Get Him to the Greek is a 2010 American comedy film written, produced and directed by Nicholas Stoller and starring Russell Brand and Jonah Hill. Released on June 4, 2010, the film is a spin-off sequel of Stoller's 2008 film Forgetting Sarah Marshall, reuniting director Stoller with stars Hill and Brand and producer Judd Apatow. Brand reprises his role as character Aldous Snow from Forgetting Sarah Marshall, while Hill plays an entirely new character referred to as Aaron Green instead of Matthew Van Der Wyk. The film also stars Elisabeth Moss, Rose Byrne, Sean "Diddy" Combs, and Colm Meaney.

Plot
In 2009, British rock star Aldous Snow releases his new album and a titular single, "African Child", which is a commercial and critical failure. In an interview, his girlfriend, pop star Jackie Q, drunkenly declares they have a boring life. Aldous relapses, ending their relationship and losing custody of his son, Naples.

Meanwhile, in Los Angeles, Aaron Green is a talent scout at Pinnacle Records, living with his girlfriend Daphne, who is completing a medical residency at a local hospital. Pinnacle is performing poorly, and the head of the company, Sergio Roma, asks for ideas. Aaron suggests Aldous play at the Greek Theatre on the tenth anniversary of a performance there in 1999.

Sergio sends Aaron to London to escort Aldous to Los Angeles. Daphne informs Aaron that she has received a residency job offer in Seattle and that they are moving there. They argue and seemingly break up. Aaron meets Aldous and learns that he had not been expecting him, thinking that the concert was not for two months. They bar-hop across the city as Aaron tries to get Aldous to catch a flight to New York City.

Aaron and Aldous go to New York City for Aldous's appearance on Today. To keep him sober, Aaron imbibes all of Aldous's alcohol and drugs. While performing live, Aldous is unable to remember the lyrics to "African Child", and replaces it with an old hit, "The Clap", to cheers from the audience. Daphne calls Aaron to apologize, only to learn that he believes they broke up. While partying, Aaron's phone accidentally calls Daphne, informing her of his drunken activities.

On their flight to Los Angeles, Aaron learns that Aldous has become depressed, as he misses his son and has been alienated from his own father, Jonathan, for years. Aaron suggests he visit him after the show; instead, Aldous insists they go to Las Vegas to see Jonathan. Sergio, having been keeping tabs on the two, arrives to take control of the situation. Meanwhile, Aldous and Jonathan argue over Jonathan's seeming disinterest in his son outside of his career and his mockery of Aldous's mother. Sergio hooks Aaron up with a sexually violent girl, Destiny, who takes him to a hotel room and rapes him. After Aaron tells Aldous that he has been raped, Aldous gives him a laced marijuana joint to calm him down. He has a bad trip, causing a fight that inadvertently sets the hotel lounge on fire.

Believing he is having a heart attack, Aldous attempts to help Aaron by giving him an adrenaline shot. They flee a drugged up Sergio to Los Angeles, where Aaron convinces Aldous to visit Jackie Q. She has been sleeping with Metallica's drummer, Lars Ulrich, and confesses that Naples is not actually Aldous's biological son. Meanwhile, Aaron goes to his home to apologize to Daphne. They are interrupted when Aldous arrives, proposing a threesome. Daphne agrees and Aaron hesitantly goes along.

Aaron angrily decides to kiss Aldous, ending the tryst. Daphne and Aaron both immediately regret it, and Aaron angrily tells Aldous to go, criticizing his mental state. Instead of preparing for his show, he goes to the rooftop of the Standard Hotel, and calls Aaron, threatening to jump. Aaron rushes to the hotel and attempts to talk him down.

Aaron arrives, in time to stop Aldous from jumping. Nevertheless, Aldous jumps into a pool several floors down, breaking his arm. Aldous tells him that he is lonely, sad, and embarrassed, but is reminded that thousands of fans love him and are waiting to see him. Aldous decides to perform at the Greek Theatre, although Aaron pleads for him to go to the hospital. Upon their arrival, Sergio offers Aaron drugs to give to Aldous so he will not cancel the concert. Aaron, tired of Sergio's abuse, quits on the spot, then walks stage-side with Aldous, trying to convince him to go to the hospital. However, seeing how happy Aldous is while performing, he heads home to reconcile with Daphne.

Months later, Aldous, sober again, has returned to fame with a single produced by Aaron based on events from their night in Las Vegas.

Cast

 Jonah Hill as Aaron Green, a record company employee
 Russell Brand as Aldous Snow, a free-spirited rock star with a faltering career who first appears in Forgetting Sarah Marshall
 Elisabeth Moss as Daphne Binks, Aaron's girlfriend
 Rose Byrne as Jackie Q, a scandalous pop star, Aldous's on and off girlfriend and Naples's mother
 P. Diddy as Sergio Roma, a record company owner and Aaron's boss who assigns him to manage Aldous
 Aziz Ansari as Matty Briggs, one of Aaron's co-workers
 Nick Kroll as Kevin McLean, one of Aaron's co-workers
 Ellie Kemper as one of Aaron's co-workers
 Kali Hawk as Kali Coleman, one of Aaron's co-workers
 Jake Johnson as Jazz Man, one of Aaron's co-workers
 Colm Meaney as Jonathan Snow, Aldous's father
 Karl Theobald as Aldous's assistant
 Carla Gallo as Destiny, a groupie
 T. J. Miller as Brian, a hotel clerk
 Neal Brennan as Brian's roommate
 Lino Facioli as Naples, Jackie Q and Aldous's son, later revealed to have been fathered by a photographer
 Kristen Schaal as a Today Show production assistant
 Lindsey Broad as Pocket Dial Girl
 Dinah Stabb as Lena Snow, Aldous's mother

Cameo guest stars

 Kristen Bell as Sarah Marshall, an actress and Aldous's former girlfriend
 Lars Ulrich
 Tom Felton
 Christina Aguilera
 Pink
 Kurt F. Loder
 Meredith Vieira
 Mario Lopez
 Pharrell Williams
 Paul Krugman
 Rick Schroder
 Zöe Salmon
 Katy Perry (deleted scenes)
 Alanis Morissette (deleted scenes)
 Meghan Markle (uncredited)
 Dee Snider (uncredited)
 Holly Weber (uncredited)
 Billy Bush
 Rachel Roberts

Brand's friends Karl Theobald, Greg "Mr Gee" Sekweyama and Jamie Sives also appear in the film.

Production

Development
A week after the release of Forgetting Sarah Marshall, Universal Studios announced a new film, Get Him to the Greek, reuniting Jonah Hill and Russell Brand with writer/director Nicholas Stoller and producer Judd Apatow. Variety initially announced the project would focus on "fresh-out-of-college insurance adjuster (Hill) who is hired to accompany an out-of-control rock star (Brand) from London to a gig at L.A.'s Greek Theatre." In July 2008, Brand mentioned that he would be reprising his Aldous Snow role from Forgetting Sarah Marshall, in a new film from Apatow in which the character was back on drugs.

In an interview with CHUD.com, Apatow would later reveal that Get Him to the Greek was indeed a spin-off of Forgetting Sarah Marshall with Brand again playing a no-longer-sober Aldous Snow while in a different interview Nicholas Stoller said that Jonah Hill will play a different character named Aaron Green, a young music executive.

Filming

While Brand was backstage at the Paramount studio lot preparing to present the 2008 MTV Video Music Awards, he approached Christina Aguilera, Pink, and Katy Perry about filming cameos for Get Him to the Greek.

Rehearsals began on April 27, 2009 and filming began on May 12 of that year. The film was shot in New York City, Las Vegas, Los Angeles and London.  News footage featured in the film was filmed after a Russell Brand stand up performance of "Scandalous" at the O2 Arena in London, which most of the audience stayed for. While filming in Trafalgar Square, Brand was pushed into a fountain by a passerby.

Release
The film was released on June 4, 2010 in the United States.
It was released on DVD on September 28, 2010.

Reception

Box office
Get Him to the Greek grossed $61 million in the United States and Canada and $30.7 million overseas bringing its worldwide total to $91.7 million, against a production budget of $40 million.

Get Him to the Greek was released alongside Killers and Marmaduke, and in its opening weekend debuted second at the box office behind Shrek Forever After with $17.6 million. The film fell to fourth the following week with a weekend gross of $10.1 million.

In the UK, Get Him to the Greek opened at No. 1 grossing £1.6 million in its first week before dropping to No. 2 the following week with takings of £1 million.

Critical response

On Rotten Tomatoes, Get Him to the Greek has an approval rating of 73% based on 203 reviews, with an average rating of 6.30/10. The site's critical consensus reads, "Thanks to a suitably raunchy script and a pair of winning performances from Jonah Hill and Russell Brand, Get Him to the Greek is one of the year's funniest comedies." On Metacritic, the film has a weighted average score of 65 out of 100, based on 39 critics, indicating "generally favorable reviews". Audiences polled by CinemaScore gave the film an average grade of "B" on an A+ to F scale.

Roger Ebert of the Chicago Sun-Times gave the film three out of four stars, writing: "under the cover of slapstick, cheap laughs, raunchy humor, gross-out physical comedy and sheer exploitation, Get Him to the Greek also is fundamentally a sound movie."

A scene in which Jonah Hill is forcibly raped has been lambasted by critics as being "particularly egregious" and "horrific" and of furthering rape culture by "reinforc(ing) cultural myths surrounding the acceptance of rape."

Home media
A 2-disc and 1-disc unrated and theatrical version of the film was released on DVD and Blu-ray Disc on September 28, 2010.

Music

Soundtrack

Kim Garner, the senior vice president of marketing and artist development at Universal Republic Records, said that Brand and Universal Pictures "felt very strongly about doing something like this as opposed to a traditional soundtrack," and that they "wanted to release it like we would an actual rock band's album."

The following songs were featured in the film, but not included in the soundtrack:

 "And Ghosted Pouts (Take the Veil Cerpin Taxt)" by The Mars Volta
 "London Calling" by The Clash
 "Anarchy in the U.K." by The Sex Pistols
 "20th Century Boy" by T.Rex
 "Rocks Off" by The Rolling Stones
 "Another Girl, Another Planet" by The Only Ones
 "Strict Machine" by Goldfrapp
 "Ghosts N Stuff" by Deadmau5 featuring Rob Swire
 "Personality Crisis" by The New York Dolls
 "Girls on the Dance Floor" by Far East Movement
 "Heureux Tous Les Deux" by Frank Alamo
 "Come on Eileen" by Dexys Midnight Runners
 "Cretin Hop" by The Ramones
 "Stop Drop and Roll" by Foxboro Hot Tubs
 "Touch My Body" by Mariah Carey
 "Love Today" by Mika
 "Fuck Me I'm Famous" by DJ Dougal and Gammer
 "What Planet You On" by Bodyrox featuring Luciana
 "Inside of You" by Infant Sorrow (which was originally featured in Forgetting Sarah Marshall).
 "Licky feat. Princess Superstar (Herve Remix)" by Larry Tee

See also
 List of films set in Las Vegas

References

External links

 
 
 
 

2010 films
2010s English-language films
2010 comedy films
American comedy films
Film spin-offs
Films about music and musicians
Films directed by Nicholas Stoller
Films produced by Judd Apatow
Films set in the Las Vegas Valley
Films set in London
Films set in Los Angeles
Films shot in the Las Vegas Valley
Films shot in London
Films shot in Los Angeles
Films shot in New York City
Films with screenplays by Nicholas Stoller
Apatow Productions films
Relativity Media films
Films about rape
Spyglass Entertainment films
Universal Pictures films
Films scored by Lyle Workman
2010s American films